The 2016 OFC U-20 Championship was the 21st edition of the OFC U-20 Championship, the biennial international youth football tournament organized by the Oceania Football Confederation (OFC) for players aged 19 and below (despite the name remaining as U-20 Championship). This year, the tournament was held in Vanuatu for the first time by itself (second time overall).

Despite the name remaining as U-20 Championship, the age limit was reduced by a year to 19 years of age. So players who wanted to participate in the tournament needed to be born on or after 1 January 1997. At an OFC Executive Committee meeting held at its Auckland headquarters in November 2013 the competition format was modified. The competition was brought forward a year and the age limit was lowered to 19 years of age. The changes were made in order to allow the winner of the competition plenty of time for preparation and player development for upcoming World Cups at Under 20 level.

In March 2015, FIFA decided that the OFC gets two slots at every FIFA U-20 and U-17 World Cup. So the top two teams qualified for the 2017 FIFA U-20 World Cup in South Korea.

Format
The qualification structure is as follows:
First round: American Samoa, Cook Islands, Samoa and Tonga played a round-robin tournament in Tonga. The winner qualified for the tournament.
Tournament (2016 OFC U-20 Championship): A total of eight teams (Fiji, New Caledonia, New Zealand, Papua New Guinea, Solomon Islands, Tahiti, Vanuatu, and the first round winner) played the tournament in Vanuatu. For the group stage, they were divided into two groups of four teams. The top two teams of each group advanced to the knockout stage (semi-finals and final) to decide the winner of the 2016 OFC U-20 Championship and the two teams that qualified for the 2017 FIFA U-20 World Cup.

Teams
All 11 FIFA-affiliated national teams from the OFC entered qualification.

Squads

Venues

First round
The preliminary tournament was hosted by Tonga between 21 and 27 June 2016. The winner qualified for the tournament final.

Four referees and four assistant referees were named for the preliminary round of the tournament.

Referees
 Salesh Chand
 Joel Hoppken
 Nelson Sogo
 Campbell-Kirk Waugh

Assistant referees
 Ujwaal Mudliar
 Phul Singh
 Jeffery Solodia
 Isaac Trevis

All times are local, TOT (UTC+13).

Second round
The tournament final was scheduled for 3–17 September 2016 (originally 19–26 September 2016). Vanuatu were announced as the host in December 2015.

The draw was held on 22 June 2016. The eight teams were drawn into two groups of four teams. There was no seeding, except that hosts Vanuatu were assigned to position A1 in the draw. The top two teams of each group advanced to the semi-finals.

All times are local, VUT (UTC+11).

Group A

Group B

Knockout stage

Bracket

Semi-finals
Winners qualified for 2017 FIFA U-20 World Cup.

Final

Goalscorers
5 goals

 Dwayne Tiputoa
 Myer Bevan

4 goals

 Moses Dyer
 Pago Tunupopo

3 goals

 Lucas Imrie
 Albert Witney
 Heirauarii Salem
 Hemaloto Polovili

2 goals

 Thomas Gope-Fenepej
 Samuelu Malo
 Godine Tenene
 Ronaldo Wilkins

1 goal

 Steven Fiso
 Kimiora Samuela
 Conroy Tiputoa
 Michael Wood
 France Catarogo
 Leroy Jennings
 Warren Houala
 Cyril Nypie
 Pothin Poma
 Albert Watrone
 Hunter Ashworth
 Reese Cox
 Clayton Lewis
 Alu Awi
 Peter Dabinyaba Jr.
 Gabby Yanum
 Timothy Hunt
 Frank Mariner
 Joe Gise
 Richard Raramo
 Augustine Waita
 Rayan Petitgas
 Marc Siejidr
 Sandro Tau
 Anthony Likiliki
 Talatala Po'oi
 Bong Kalo
 Frederick Massing
 Jason Thomas

Awards
The Golden Ball Award is awarded to the most outstanding player of the tournament. The Golden Glove Award is awarded to the best goalkeeper of the tournament. The Golden Boot Award is awarded to the top scorer of the tournament. The Fair Play Award is awarded to the team with the best disciplinary record at the tournament.

Qualified teams for FIFA U-20 World Cup
The following two teams from OFC qualified for the 2017 FIFA U-20 World Cup.

1 Bold indicates champion for that year. Italic indicates host for that year.

References

2016
2016–17 in OFC football
2016 in Vanuatuan sport
2016 Ofc U-20 Championship
September 2016 sports events in Oceania
2016 in youth association football